University of Sanya (USY)  was established in 2005 and endowed by Zhejiang Geely Holding Group as one of the first privately owned universities in China. Based in Sanya in Hainan Province, along the coast of the South China Sea, it currently consists of 18 schools and an office of academic affairs. 71 undergraduate degree programs in 9 categories are offered, including law, literature, economics, management, engineering, science, agriculture, education, and art. In 2018, the university enrolled 20,000 students together with 1000 teaching and research staff members.

The university offers courses across geographical regions, and currently has made partnerships with State Forestry and Grassland Administration of China, Department of Culture Radio Television Publication and Sports of Hainan, Hainan Provincial Tourism Bureau, Peking University, Tsinghua University, Institute of Deep-sea Science and Engineering of Chinese Academy of Sciences, Hainan Microsoft Innovation Center, etc. USY pioneers in several key subjects, such as Tourism Management, Financial Engineering, in which Saxo Fintech Business school  was established jointly with Saxo Bank, and Automotive Engineering with Geely Auto. 

Due to its strategic geographical location in Sanya which is boasted as "China's Hawaii", many academic forums including Global Humboldt Forum were held on campus. Boao Forum for Asia also has close proximity to the university and city.

Academics

Accreditation and memberships 
USY is a member of SAP University Alliances.

Notable faculty members 
 Chuah Hean Teik, University Advisor for University of Sanya and Former President cum CEO of Universiti Tunku Abdul Rahman

See also
Geely University of China - Private university located at Chengdu founded by Geely
List of universities and colleges in Hainan

References

External links
Official website

Universities and colleges in Hainan
Sanya
Educational institutions established in 2005
2005 establishments in China